Diario: Rebirth Moon Legend is an enhanced port of Idea Factory's tactical RPG Rebirth Moon, which appeared originally on the PS2.

GameSpot gave it a 7.3/10.

References

External links
Official "Diario: Rebirth Moon Legend" homepage

2007 video games
Japan-exclusive video games
Xbox 360-only games
Role-playing video games
Video games developed in Japan
Xbox 360 games
Idea Factory games
Single-player video games